Vitória Futebol Clube is a rugby team based in Setúbal, Portugal. In the 2008/09 season, they will play 
in the First Division of the Campeonato Nacional de Rugby (National Championship), after being promoted by winning the Second Division final against Cascais Rugby Linha.

Current squad

External links
Vitória F.C. rugby section
Vitória F.C. rugby at Blogspot

Vitória F.C.
Portuguese rugby union teams